The men's 50 kilometre classical cross-country skiing competition at the 2018 Winter Olympics was held on 24 February 2018 at 14:00 KST at the Alpensia Cross-Country Skiing Centre in Pyeongchang, South Korea.

Qualification

A total of up to 310 cross-country skiers qualified across all eleven events. Athletes qualified for this event by having met the A qualification standard, which meant having 100 or less FIS Points in the distance classification. The Points list takes into average the best results of athletes per discipline during the qualification period (1 July 2016 to 21 January 2018). Countries received additional quotas by having athletes ranked in the top 30 of the FIS Olympics Points list (two per gender maximum, overall across all events). Countries also received an additional quota (one per gender maximum) if an athlete was ranked in the top 300 of the FIS Olympics Points list. After the distribution of B standard quotas, the remaining quotas were distributed using the Olympic FIS Points list, with each athlete only counting once for qualification purposes. A country could only enter a maximum of four athletes for the event.

Competition schedule
All times are (UTC+9).

Results
The race started at 14:00.

References

Men's cross-country skiing at the 2018 Winter Olympics
Men's 50 kilometre cross-country skiing at the Winter Olympics